Elgin is an unincorporated community in Shelby County, in the U.S. state of Missouri.

History
A post office called Elgin was established in 1887, and remained in operation until 1907. The community has the name of George Elgin, a pioneer citizen.

References

Unincorporated communities in Shelby County, Missouri
Unincorporated communities in Missouri